Cossus shmakovi is a moth in the family Cossidae. It is found in Russia (Tuva) and possibly Mongolia.

References

Natural History Museum Lepidoptera generic names catalog

Cossus
Moths described in 2004
Moths of Asia